Talakona is situated in Tirupati district of Andhra Pradesh, India. It is a resort with waterfalls, dense forests and wildlife. Talakona waterfall is in Sri Venkateswara National Park, Tirupati district of Andhra Pradesh.  With a -fall, Talakona is the highest waterfall in Andhra Pradesh state. Talakona is also known for the Lord Siddheswara Swamy Temple, which is located close to the waterfall.

Location

Talakona is located in Nerabailu village in Yerravaripalem Mandal of Tirupati district.

Talakona is a resort with waterfalls, dense forests and wildlife. The area was declared a biosphere reserve in 1989 due to the presence of rich variety of flora and fauna.

Etymology 

Talakona means head hill in Telugu (tala - head and kona - hill). However, Thalakona allegorically means "the head of the Seshachalam hills" as these mountains are believed to be the starting point of the Tirumala mountain ranges.

Flora and fauna
The Talakona forests host rare and endangered species of animals like Slender Loris, Indian Giant Squirrel, Mouse Deer, Golden Gecko, Panther, Porcupine, Chital and Sambar. Endemic species like Red Sander, Cycas beddomeii and Enteda like giant plants are also found in this region. The forest is mostly covered with sandalwood trees with some medicinal plants.

Tourism 
 The waters of Talakona are enriched with herbs and people believe that it has healing properties. A long and treacherous trekking route leads to the top of the hill, which can be reached by multiple paths. Talakona hills geographically is considered a part of the Eastern Ghats.

There is a beautiful waterfall falling deep into the valley from a cliff on the upper reaches. According to the local residents, it is said that the origin of water is difficult to be traced out since an underground stream surfaces here.

There used to be a 240 meter long canopy rope walk, about 35 to 40 feet in height . There are number of trek routes in different categories of difficulty, giving an option for the visitor to choose their route.

In the area there is an ancient Siva temple which is flooded with devotees during Sivarathri festival. There are also deep caves scattered over the mountains where it is believed that sages meditate eternally. A stream flows near the canopy walk area where a bathing ghat is under construction.

Accommodation is also available in this dense forest,

History of Talakona Temple
The Temple at Talakona water falls is  a Siva Temple known as "SIDDHESWARA SWAMY TEMPLE". The deity is called as 'Siddheswara'. As per the Local people, the temple was built some 140 years ago.The SIVA LINGA in the temple was  brought from the ruined temple of Rayavaripalli, a village in Pulicherla Mandal, On olden days there was a custom that if any new temple is constructed, instead of making a new Siva Linga, can install old one which lies without Pooja in ruined Temples. Based on this custom the SIVA LINGA was brought from Rayavaripalli ruined temple. The relics of the ruined temple can be seen today also in the agricultural fields of Rayavaripalli. That field is called as " Lingaakaaram kaada kayya", till today, which means a piece of agricultural field near Siva Lingam.

References 

Bansc

External links

Tirupati district
Waterfalls of Andhra Pradesh
Eastern Ghats
Hindu temples in Tirupati district
Geography of Tirupati district
Waterfalls of India